This is a list of châteaux in Overseas France.

Guadeloupe 
Fort Fleur d'épée, Gosier
 Fort Napoléon des Saintes, on the island Terre-de-Haut

Guiana 
Fort Cépérou, Cayenne
Diamond Fort, Remire-Montjoly
Fort Trio, Matoury

Martinique 
Château Dubuc, at La Trinité (ruined)
Fort Saint-Pierre, at Saint-Pierre
Fort Saint-Louis, at Fort-de-France

La Réunion 
Château du Gol, at Saint-Louis.
Château Morange, at Saint-Denis.

See also
 List of castles in France

 Overseas
Overseas France-related lists